This is the list of schools in the Redbridge Borough of London, England.

State-funded schools

Primary schools

 Aldborough Primary School
 Aldersbrook Primary School
 Al-Noor Muslim Primary School
 Ark Isaac Newton Academy
 ATAM Academy
 Avanti Court Primary School
 Barley Lane Primary School
 Chadwell Primary School
 Christchurch Primary School
 Churchfields Infants' School
 Churchfields Junior School
 Cleveland Road Primary School
 Clore Tikva School
 Coppice Primary School
 Cranbrook Primary School
 Downshall Primary School
 Fairlop Primary School
 Farnham Green Primary School
 Fullwood Primary School
 Gearies Primary School
 Gilbert Colvin Primary School
 Glade Primary School
 Goodmayes Primary School
 Gordon Primary School
 Grove Primary School
 Highlands Primary School
 John Bramston Primary School
 Loxford School
 Manford Primary School
 Mayespark Primary School
 Mossford Green Primary School
 Newbury Park Primary School
 Nightingale Primary School
 Oakdale Infants' School
 Oakdale Junior School
 Our Lady of Lourdes RC Primary School
 Parkhill Infants' School
 Parkhill Junior School
 Ray Lodge Primary School
 Redbridge Primary School
 Roding Primary School
 St Aidan's RC Primary Academy
 St Antony's RC Primary School
 St Augustine's RC Primary School
 St Bede's RC Primary School
 SS Peter and Paul's RC Primary School
 Seven Kings School
 Snaresbrook Primary School
 South Park Primary School
 Uphall Primary School
 Wanstead Church School
 Wells Primary School
 William Torbitt Primary School
 Winston Way Academy
 Wohl Ilford Jewish Primary School
 Woodlands Primary School

source

Non-selective secondary schools

 Ark Isaac Newton Academy
 ATAM Academy
 Beal High School
 Caterham High School
 Chadwell Heath Academy
 The Forest Academy
 King Solomon High School
 Loxford School
 Mayfield School
 Oaks Park High School
 Palmer Catholic Academy
 Seven Kings School
 Trinity Catholic High School
 Ursuline Academy Ilford
 Valentines High School
 Wanstead High School
 Woodbridge High School

Grammar schools
 Ilford County High School
 Woodford County High School For Girls

Special and alternative schools

Beacon Business Innovation Hub
The Constance Bridgeman Centre
Hatchside School
Hatton School
Little Heath School
New Rush Hall School
Newbridge School
Redbridge Alternative Provision

Further education
Redbridge College
Redbridge Institute of Adult Education

Independent schools

Primary and preparatory schools

Al-Noor Primary School
Apex Primary School
Avon House School
Beehive Preparatory School
Eastcourt Independent School
St Aubyn's School
Snaresbrook Preparatory School
The Ursuline Prep School Ilford
Woodford Green Preparatory School

Senior and all-through schools
Bancroft's School
Park School for Girls
Read Academy Education

Special and alternative schools
Endeavour House School
Oak House School
Stradbroke

Further education
Mont Rose College of Management and Sciences

References

External links 
Education and learning (London Borough of Redbridge)

 
Redbridge